This is a list of the mayors of Vigo, Spain, since the Spanish Civil War.

Since the Spanish Civil War
1938–1939: Luís Suárez Llanos-Menacho
1939–1940: Estanislao Durán Gómez
1940–1949: Luís Suárez Llanos-Menacho
1949–1960: Tomás Pérez-Lorente
1960–1963: Salvador de Ponte y Conde de la Peña
1963: Alberto Varela Grandal
1963–1964: José Ramón Fontán Gonzalez
1964–1970: Jesús Portanet Suárez
1970–1974: Antonio Bernardino Ramilo Fernández-Areal
1974–1978: Joaquín García Picher
1978–1979: Emma González Bermello

Since democratic elections in 1979
 1979–1991: Manoel Soto – PSdeG-PSOE
 1991–1995: Carlos Alberto González Príncipe – PSdeG-PSOE
 1995–1999: Manuel Pérez Álvarez – PPdeG
 1999–2003: Lois Pérez Castrillo – BNG
 2003: Ventura Pérez Mariño – PSdeG-PSOE
 2003–2007: Corina Porro Martínez – PPdeG 
 2007–: Abel Caballero – PSdeG-PSOE

Bibliography 
 Os alcaldes e os concellos de Vigo, Vigo, Instituto de Estudios Vigueses, 1991, 
 Historia ilustrada de Vigo, 1996, 

Vigo
Vigo